A dihydroxynaphthoquinone is any of several organic compounds that can be viewed as derivatives of naphthoquinone through replacement of two hydrogen atoms (H) by hydroxyl groups (OH).

The unqualified term "dihydroxynaphthoquinone" usually means a derivative of 1,4-naphthoquinone.  Other dihydroxy- compounds can be derived from the two other known isomers,  1,2-naphthoquinone (ortho-) and 2,6-naphthoquinone (amphi-).

Isomers

From 1,4-naphthoquinone
Due to the symmetry of the parent quinone, there are only nine distinct isomers of dihydroxy-1,4-naphthoquinone:
2,3-Dihydroxy-1,4-naphthoquinone.
2,5-Dihydroxy-1,4-naphthoquinone.
2,6-Dihydroxy-1,4-naphthoquinone.
2,7-Dihydroxy-1,4-naphthoquinone.
2,8-Dihydroxy-1,4-naphthoquinone.
5,6-Dihydroxy-1,4-naphthoquinone.
5,7-Dihydroxy-1,4-naphthoquinone.
5,8-Dihydroxy-1,4-naphthoquinone (naphthazarin).
6,7-Dihydroxy-1,4-naphthoquinone.

From 1,2-naphthoquinone
From 1,2-naphthoquinone there are 12 possible dihydroxy- isomers:
3,4-Dihydroxy-1,2-naphthoquinone
3,5-Dihydroxy-1,2-naphthoquinone
3,6-Dihydroxy-1,2-naphthoquinone
3,7-Dihydroxy-1,2-naphthoquinone
3,8-Dihydroxy-1,2-naphthoquinone
4,5-Dihydroxy-1,2-naphthoquinone
4,6-Dihydroxy-1,2-naphthoquinone
4,7-Dihydroxy-1,2-naphthoquinone
4,8-Dihydroxy-1,2-naphthoquinone
5,6-Dihydroxy-1,2-naphthoquinone
5,7-Dihydroxy-1,2-naphthoquinone
5,8-Dihydroxy-1,2-naphthoquinone
6,7-Dihydroxy-1,2-naphthoquinone
6,8-Dihydroxy-1,2-naphthoquinone
7,8-Dihydroxy-1,2-naphthoquinone

From 2,6-naphthoquinone
From the symmetrical 2,6-naphthoquinone there are only nine dihydroxy- isomers:
1,3-Dihydroxy-2,6-naphthoquinone
1,4-Dihydroxy-2,6-naphthoquinone
1,5-Dihydroxy-2,6-naphthoquinone
1,7-Dihydroxy-2,6-naphthoquinone
1,8-Dihydroxy-2,6-naphthoquinone
3,4-Dihydroxy-2,6-naphthoquinone
3,7-Dihydroxy-2,6-naphthoquinone
3,8-Dihydroxy-2,6-naphthoquinone
4,8-Dihydroxy-2,6-naphthoquinone

See also
Hydroxynaphthoquinone
Trihydroxynaphthoquinone
Dihydroxyanthraquinone

References

Hydroxynaphthoquinones